Schistotylus purpuratus, commonly known as purple sprites, is the only species in the genus Schistotylus from the orchid family, Orchidaceae. It is a small epiphytic orchid with up to six crowded, linear leaves and up to ten cup-shaped, pale green flowers with purple marking and a mostly white labellum. It grows in rainforest and swampy heath in eastern Australia.

Description
Schistotylus purpuratus is a small epiphytic herb, usually with only a single growth. Flowering occurs from August to October.

Taxonomy and naming
Purple sprites was first formally described in 1938 by Herman Rupp who originally gave it the name Cleisostoma gemmatum and published the description in The Victorian Naturalist. That name was, however a nomen illegitimum because it had been used for a different species, and Rupp changed in the name to Cleisostoma purpuratum in a later edition of the same journal. In 1941, Rupp changed the name again to Schistotylus purpuratus. The specific epithet (purpuratus) is derived from the Latin word purpura meaning "a purple dye", referring to "the striking reddish purple suffusion of the column.

Distribution and habitat
Schistotylus purpuratus grows on shrubs and the twigs of trees in forest, heath and scrub. It is found between Nerang in Queensland and the Carrai National Park in New South Wales.

See also
 List of Orchidaceae genera

References

Endemic orchids of Australia
Orchids of New South Wales
Orchids of Queensland
Monotypic Epidendroideae genera
Vandeae genera
Aeridinae
Plants described in 1938